Kapargah (also Romanized as Kapargāh, Gapargah, Kafargāh, Khafargāh, and Khafr Gāh) is a village in Hemmatabad Rural District, in the Central District of Borujerd County, Lorestan Province, Iran. At the 2006 census, its population was 252, in 61 families.

References 

Towns and villages in Borujerd County